TV's 50 Greatest Stars was a one-off British television awards show which invited the viewing public to vote for their favourite on-screen stars from a list compiled by the broadcaster ITV. Fifty actors, actresses, presenters and comedians, both alive and dead, were featured on the list, the number 50 being chosen to coincide with ITV's fiftieth birthday celebrations in September 2005 (although technically, there were 55 individuals on the list, due to partnerships such The Two Ronnies and Richard and Judy being counted as one entry). The two-hour show, directed by Mark Robinson, was hosted by Coronation Street actor Bradley Walsh, who ran through the stars in reverse order – the order was determined by the public, who could vote, either online or in the TV Times, for five (no more and no fewer) of their favourite celebrities. Members of the public could also nominate other television celebrities who had not been included on the list.  Actor David Jason won, with Morecambe and Wise and John Thaw coming in second and third place respectively; the majority of nominees were comedians, a fifth were deceased and men outnumbered women by almost five to one. Walsh was quoted as saying "I'm delighted to be involved in this show. It will be a great celebration of some of the most fantastic stars from the last 50 years. It will be interesting to see who the viewers vote to come out on top." The show was narrated by Mel Giedroyc.

Results

References

External links
TV's 50 Greatest Stars at IMDb

ITV (TV network) original programming
2006 in British television